Eublemma squamilinea is a moth of the family Erebidae first described by Felder and Rogenhofer in 1874. It is found in South Africa.

References

External links

Endemic moths of South Africa
Acontiinae
Moths described in 1874